Elinor Crawley (born 8 November 1991) is a Welsh actress. She is best known for her role as Thyri in the television series Vikings and for portraying Cecily of York in The White Queen.

Early life and education 
Crawley was diagnosed with Type 1 diabetes when she was nine years old. She attended Whitchurch High School and trained at The Workshop, a film and television performance training project that is based in Cardiff.

Personal life 
She is a supporter of the charity Diabetes UK. Her sister is a paediatrician.

Filmography

Film

Television

References

External links 
 
 
 
 Curtis Brown

1991 births
Living people
21st-century Welsh actresses
Welsh actresses
Actresses from Cardiff
Welsh television actresses
Welsh film actresses
People with type 1 diabetes